Franck Solforosi (born 10 September 1984) is a French rower. A native of Lyon, he competed at the 2008, 2008 and 2016 Summer Olympics.

External links
 
 
 

1984 births
Living people
French male rowers
Sportspeople from Lyon
Olympic rowers of France
Olympic bronze medalists for France
Olympic medalists in rowing
Rowers at the 2008 Summer Olympics
Rowers at the 2012 Summer Olympics
Rowers at the 2016 Summer Olympics
Medalists at the 2016 Summer Olympics
World Rowing Championships medalists for France
Mediterranean Games gold medalists for France
Mediterranean Games medalists in rowing
Competitors at the 2005 Mediterranean Games
European Rowing Championships medalists
20th-century French people
21st-century French people